The 1983 World Figure Skating Championships were held in Helsinki, Finland from March 8 to 13. At the event, sanctioned by the International Skating Union, medals were awarded in men's singles, ladies' singles, pair skating, and ice dancing.

The ISU Representative was Hermann Schiechtl and the ISU Technical Delegate Elemér Terták. The original dance was part of the competition for the first time.

Medal tables

Medalists

Medals by country

Results

Men

Referee:
 Sonia Bianchetti 

Assistant Referee:
 Oskar Madl 

Judges:
 Irina Absaliamova 
 Kazuo Ohashi 
 Heinz Müllenbach 
 Helga von Wiecki 
 Tjaša Andrée 
 Monique Georgelin 
 Hugh C. Graham, Jr. 
 Gerhardt Bubnik 
 Margaret Berezowski 

Substitute judge:
 Walter Hütter

Ladies

Referee:
 Benjamin T. Wright 

Assistant Referee:
 Leena Vainio 

Judges:
 Linda Petersen 
 Raymond Alperth 
 Margaret Berezowski 
 Jacqueline Itschner 
 Monique Petis 
 Ludwig Gassner 
 Eugen Romminger 
 Hideo Sugita 
 Britta Lindgren 
 Walburga Grimm 

Substitute judge:
 Giovanni De Mori

Pairs

Referee:
 Donald H. Gilchrist 

Assistant Referee:
 Erika Schiechtl 

Judges:
 Suzanne Fancis 
 Mikhail Drei 
 Ingrid Reetz 
 Hely Abbondati 
 Dagmar Řeháková 
 Virginia LeFevre 
 Sally-Anne Stapleford 
 Ingrid Linke 
 Hideo Sugita 

Substitute judge:
 Jürg Wilhelm

Ice dancing
Jayne Torvill / Christopher Dean got 5.9 scores from all nine judges in their third dance, the Argentine tango, of the compulsory portion of the event.

Referee:
 Lawrence Demmy 

Assistant Referee:
 Roland Wehinger 

Judges:
 Cia Bordogna 
 Jürg Wilhelm 
 Kazuo Ohashi 
 Margaret Freepartner 
 Ann Shaw 
 Heide Maritszak 
 Igor Kabanov 
 Katalin Alpern 
 Roy Mason 

Substitute judge:
 Lysiane Lauret

References

Sources
 Result list provided by the ISU

World Figure Skating Championships
World Figure Skating Championships
World Figure Skating Championships 1983
International figure skating competitions hosted by Finland
International sports competitions in Helsinki
1980s in Helsinki
March 1983 sports events in Europe